The following page lists all power stations in Austria. For generation of traction current see List of installations for 15 kV AC railway electrification in Germany, Austria and Switzerland, for that of Mariazeller Bahn, see Mariazeller Bahn#Power Supply.

Thermal

Fossil

Nuclear

Renewable

Biomass

Hydroelectric

Wind

See also 

 List of power stations in Europe
 List of largest power stations in the world

References

Austria
Power stations in Austria
Power stations